This is an incomplete list of lists pertaining to the United States Congress.

Sessions
 List of United States Congresses

Leaders

House of Representatives
 List of speakers of the United States House of Representatives
 List of Speaker of the United States House of Representatives elections
 Party leaders of the United States House of Representatives
 House Democratic Caucus
 Leader of the House Democratic Caucus
 Chair of the House Democratic Caucus
 Vice Chair of the House Democratic Caucus
 House Republican Conference
 Leader of the House Republican Conference
 Chair of the House Republican Conference
 Vice Chair of the House Republican Conference
 Secretary of the House Republican Conference
 Dean of the United States House of Representatives

Senate
 List of presidents pro tempore of the United States Senate
 Party leaders of the United States Senate
 Current party leaders of the United States Senate
 Senate Democratic Caucus
 Chair of the Senate Democratic Caucus
 Vice Chair of the Senate Democratic Caucus
 Secretary of the Senate Democratic Conference
 Chair of the Senate Democratic Policy Committee
 Senate Republican Conference
 Leader of the Senate Republican Conference
 Chair of the Senate Republican Conference
 Vice Chair of the Senate Republican Conference
 Chair of the Senate Republican Policy Committee
 Dean of the United States Senate
 Presiding Officer of the United States Senate

Members 
 Current members of the United States Congress
 List of members of the United States Congress from multiple states
 List of members of the United States Congress by brevity of service
 List of members of the United States Congress by longevity of service
 List of historical longest-serving members of the United States Congress
 List of United States Congress members who died in office
 List of United States Congress members killed or wounded in office
 List of members of the United States Congress who owned slaves

Freshmen 

 List of new members of the 98th United States Congress
 List of new members of the 99th United States Congress
 List of new members of the 100th United States Congress
 List of new members of the 101st United States Congress
 List of new members of the 102nd United States Congress
 List of new members of the 103rd United States Congress
 List of new members of the 104th United States Congress
 List of new members of the 105th United States Congress
 List of new members of the 106th United States Congress
 List of new members of the 107th United States Congress
 List of new members of the 108th United States Congress
 List of new members of the 109th United States Congress
 List of new members of the 110th United States Congress
 List of new members of the 111th United States Congress
 List of new members of the 112th United States Congress
 List of new members of the 113th United States Congress
 List of new members of the 114th United States Congress
 List of new members of the 115th United States Congress
 List of new members of the 116th United States Congress
 List of new members of the 117th United States Congress
 List of new members of the 118th United States Congress

House of Representatives
 List of current members of the United States House of Representatives
 List of former members of the United States House of Representatives
 List of members-elect of the United States House of Representatives who never took their seats
 List of United States representatives expelled, censured, or reprimanded
 List of United States representatives who switched parties
 List of members of the United States House of Representatives who served a single term
 List of members of the United States House of Representatives who lost re-election in a primary

Seniority 
 Seniority in the United States House of Representatives
 List of members of the United States House of Representatives in the 1st Congress by seniority
 List of members of the United States House of Representatives in the 2nd Congress by seniority
 List of members of the United States House of Representatives in the 3rd Congress by seniority
 List of members of the United States House of Representatives in the 4th Congress by seniority
 List of members of the United States House of Representatives in the 5th Congress by seniority
 List of members of the United States House of Representatives in the 6th Congress by seniority
 List of members of the United States House of Representatives in the 7th Congress by seniority
 List of members of the United States House of Representatives in the 8th Congress by seniority
 List of members of the United States House of Representatives in the 9th Congress by seniority
 List of members of the United States House of Representatives in the 10th Congress by seniority
 List of members of the United States House of Representatives in the 11th Congress by seniority
 List of members of the United States House of Representatives in the 12th Congress by seniority
 List of members of the United States House of Representatives in the 13th Congress by seniority
 List of members of the United States House of Representatives in the 14th Congress by seniority
 List of members of the United States House of Representatives in the 15th Congress by seniority
 List of members of the United States House of Representatives in the 16th Congress by seniority
 List of members of the United States House of Representatives in the 17th Congress by seniority
 List of members of the United States House of Representatives in the 18th Congress by seniority
 List of members of the United States House of Representatives in the 19th Congress by seniority
 List of members of the United States House of Representatives in the 20th Congress by seniority
 List of members of the United States House of Representatives in the 21st Congress by seniority
 List of members of the United States House of Representatives in the 22nd Congress by seniority
 List of members of the United States House of Representatives in the 23rd Congress by seniority
 List of members of the United States House of Representatives in the 24th Congress by seniority
 List of members of the United States House of Representatives in the 25th Congress by seniority
 List of members of the United States House of Representatives in the 26th Congress by seniority
 List of members of the United States House of Representatives in the 27th Congress by seniority
 List of members of the United States House of Representatives in the 28th Congress by seniority
 List of members of the United States House of Representatives in the 29th Congress by seniority
 List of members of the United States House of Representatives in the 30th Congress by seniority
 List of members of the United States House of Representatives in the 31st Congress by seniority
 List of members of the United States House of Representatives in the 32nd Congress by seniority
 List of members of the United States House of Representatives in the 33rd Congress by seniority
 List of members of the United States House of Representatives in the 34th Congress by seniority
 List of members of the United States House of Representatives in the 35th Congress by seniority
 List of members of the United States House of Representatives in the 36th Congress by seniority
 List of members of the United States House of Representatives in the 37th Congress by seniority
 List of members of the United States House of Representatives in the 38th Congress by seniority
 List of members of the United States House of Representatives in the 39th Congress by seniority
 List of members of the United States House of Representatives in the 40th Congress by seniority
 List of members of the United States House of Representatives in the 41st Congress by seniority
 List of members of the United States House of Representatives in the 42nd Congress by seniority
 List of members of the United States House of Representatives in the 43rd Congress by seniority
 List of members of the United States House of Representatives in the 44th Congress by seniority
 List of members of the United States House of Representatives in the 45th Congress by seniority
 List of members of the United States House of Representatives in the 46th Congress by seniority
 List of members of the United States House of Representatives in the 47th Congress by seniority
 List of members of the United States House of Representatives in the 48th Congress by seniority
 List of members of the United States House of Representatives in the 49th Congress by seniority
 List of members of the United States House of Representatives in the 50th Congress by seniority
 List of members of the United States House of Representatives in the 51st Congress by seniority
 List of members of the United States House of Representatives in the 52nd Congress by seniority
 List of members of the United States House of Representatives in the 53rd Congress by seniority
 List of members of the United States House of Representatives in the 54th Congress by seniority
 List of members of the United States House of Representatives in the 55th Congress by seniority
 List of members of the United States House of Representatives in the 56th Congress by seniority
 List of members of the United States House of Representatives in the 57th Congress by seniority
 List of members of the United States House of Representatives in the 58th Congress by seniority
 List of members of the United States House of Representatives in the 59th Congress by seniority
 List of members of the United States House of Representatives in the 60th Congress by seniority
 List of members of the United States House of Representatives in the 61st Congress by seniority 
 List of members of the United States House of Representatives in the 62nd Congress by seniority
 List of members of the United States House of Representatives in the 63rd Congress by seniority
 List of members of the United States House of Representatives in the 64th Congress by seniority
 List of members of the United States House of Representatives in the 65th Congress by seniority
 List of members of the United States House of Representatives in the 66th Congress by seniority
 List of members of the United States House of Representatives in the 67th Congress by seniority
 List of members of the United States House of Representatives in the 68th Congress by seniority
 List of members of the United States House of Representatives in the 69th Congress by seniority
 List of members of the United States House of Representatives in the 70th Congress by seniority
 List of members of the United States House of Representatives in the 71st Congress by seniority
 List of members of the United States House of Representatives in the 72nd Congress by seniority
 List of members of the United States House of Representatives in the 73rd Congress by seniority
 List of members of the United States House of Representatives in the 74th Congress by seniority
 List of members of the United States House of Representatives in the 75th Congress by seniority
 List of members of the United States House of Representatives in the 76th Congress by seniority
 List of members of the United States House of Representatives in the 77th Congress by seniority
 List of members of the United States House of Representatives in the 78th Congress by seniority
 List of members of the United States House of Representatives in the 79th Congress by seniority
 List of members of the United States House of Representatives in the 80th Congress by seniority
 List of members of the United States House of Representatives in the 81st Congress by seniority
 List of members of the United States House of Representatives in the 82nd Congress by seniority
 List of members of the United States House of Representatives in the 83rd Congress by seniority
 List of members of the United States House of Representatives in the 84th Congress by seniority
 List of members of the United States House of Representatives in the 85th Congress by seniority
 List of members of the United States House of Representatives in the 86th Congress by seniority
 List of members of the United States House of Representatives in the 87th Congress by seniority
 List of members of the United States House of Representatives in the 88th Congress by seniority
 List of members of the United States House of Representatives in the 89th Congress by seniority
 List of members of the United States House of Representatives in the 90th Congress by seniority
 List of members of the United States House of Representatives in the 91st Congress by seniority
 List of members of the United States House of Representatives in the 92nd Congress by seniority
 List of members of the United States House of Representatives in the 93rd Congress by seniority
 List of members of the United States House of Representatives in the 94th Congress by seniority
 List of members of the United States House of Representatives in the 95th Congress by seniority
 List of members of the United States House of Representatives in the 96th Congress by seniority
 List of members of the United States House of Representatives in the 97th Congress by seniority
 List of members of the United States House of Representatives in the 98th Congress by seniority
 List of members of the United States House of Representatives in the 99th Congress by seniority
 List of members of the United States House of Representatives in the 100th Congress by seniority
 List of members of the United States House of Representatives in the 101st Congress by seniority
 List of members of the United States House of Representatives in the 102nd Congress by seniority
 List of members of the United States House of Representatives in the 103rd Congress by seniority
 List of members of the United States House of Representatives in the 104th Congress by seniority
 List of members of the United States House of Representatives in the 105th Congress by seniority
 List of members of the United States House of Representatives in the 106th Congress by seniority
 List of members of the United States House of Representatives in the 107th Congress by seniority
 List of members of the United States House of Representatives in the 108th Congress by seniority
 List of members of the United States House of Representatives in the 109th Congress by seniority
 List of members of the United States House of Representatives in the 110th Congress by seniority
 List of members of the United States House of Representatives in the 111th Congress by seniority
 List of members of the United States House of Representatives in the 112th Congress by seniority
 List of members of the United States House of Representatives in the 113th Congress by seniority
 List of members of the United States House of Representatives in the 114th Congress by seniority
 List of members of the United States House of Representatives in the 115th Congress by seniority
 List of members of the United States House of Representatives in the 116th Congress by seniority
 List of members of the United States House of Representatives in the 117th Congress by seniority
 List of members of the United States House of Representatives in the 118th Congress by seniority

Senate
 List of current United States senators
 List of former United States senators
 List of appointed United States senators
 List of United States senators expelled or censured
 List of United States senators who switched parties

Seniority 
 Seniority in the United States Senate

 List of United States senators in the 1st Congress by seniority
 List of United States senators in the 2nd Congress by seniority
 List of United States senators in the 3rd Congress by seniority
 List of United States senators in the 4th Congress by seniority
 List of United States senators in the 5th Congress by seniority
 List of United States senators in the 6th Congress by seniority
 List of United States senators in the 7th Congress by seniority
 List of United States senators in the 8th Congress by seniority
 List of United States senators in the 9th Congress by seniority
 List of United States senators in the 10th Congress by seniority
 List of United States senators in the 11th Congress by seniority
 List of United States senators in the 12th Congress by seniority
 List of United States senators in the 13th Congress by seniority
 List of United States senators in the 14th Congress by seniority
 List of United States senators in the 15th Congress by seniority
 List of United States senators in the 16th Congress by seniority
 List of United States senators in the 17th Congress by seniority
 List of United States senators in the 18th Congress by seniority
 List of United States senators in the 19th Congress by seniority
 List of United States senators in the 20th Congress by seniority
 List of United States senators in the 21st Congress by seniority
 List of United States senators in the 22nd Congress by seniority
 List of United States senators in the 23rd Congress by seniority
 List of United States senators in the 24th Congress by seniority
 List of United States senators in the 25th Congress by seniority
 List of United States senators in the 26th Congress by seniority
 List of United States senators in the 27th Congress by seniority
 List of United States senators in the 28th Congress by seniority
 List of United States senators in the 29th Congress by seniority
 List of United States senators in the 30th Congress by seniority
 List of United States senators in the 31st Congress by seniority
 List of United States senators in the 32nd Congress by seniority
 List of United States senators in the 33rd Congress by seniority
 List of United States senators in the 34th Congress by seniority
 List of United States senators in the 35th Congress by seniority
 List of United States senators in the 36th Congress by seniority
 List of United States senators in the 37th Congress by seniority
 List of United States senators in the 38th Congress by seniority
 List of United States senators in the 39th Congress by seniority
 List of United States senators in the 40th Congress by seniority
 List of United States senators in the 41st Congress by seniority
 List of United States senators in the 42nd Congress by seniority
 List of United States senators in the 43rd Congress by seniority
 List of United States senators in the 44th Congress by seniority
 List of United States senators in the 45th Congress by seniority
 List of United States senators in the 46th Congress by seniority
 List of United States senators in the 47th Congress by seniority
 List of United States senators in the 48th Congress by seniority
 List of United States senators in the 49th Congress by seniority
 List of United States senators in the 50th Congress by seniority
 List of United States senators in the 51st Congress by seniority
 List of United States senators in the 52nd Congress by seniority
 List of United States senators in the 53rd Congress by seniority
 List of United States senators in the 54th Congress by seniority
 List of United States senators in the 55th Congress by seniority
 List of United States senators in the 56th Congress by seniority
 List of United States senators in the 57th Congress by seniority
 List of United States senators in the 58th Congress by seniority
 List of United States senators in the 59th Congress by seniority
 List of United States senators in the 60th Congress by seniority
 List of United States senators in the 61st Congress by seniority
 List of United States senators in the 62nd Congress by seniority
 List of United States senators in the 63rd Congress by seniority
 List of United States senators in the 64th Congress by seniority
 List of United States senators in the 65th Congress by seniority
 List of United States senators in the 66th Congress by seniority
 List of United States senators in the 67th Congress by seniority
 List of United States senators in the 68th Congress by seniority
 List of United States senators in the 69th Congress by seniority
 List of United States senators in the 70th Congress by seniority
 List of United States senators in the 71st Congress by seniority
 List of United States senators in the 72nd Congress by seniority
 List of United States senators in the 73rd Congress by seniority
 List of United States senators in the 74th Congress by seniority
 List of United States senators in the 75th Congress by seniority
 List of United States senators in the 76th Congress by seniority
 List of United States senators in the 77th Congress by seniority
 List of United States senators in the 78th Congress by seniority
 List of United States senators in the 79th Congress by seniority
 List of United States senators in the 80th Congress by seniority
 List of United States senators in the 81st Congress by seniority
 List of United States senators in the 82nd Congress by seniority
 List of United States senators in the 83rd Congress by seniority
 List of United States senators in the 84th Congress by seniority
 List of United States senators in the 85th Congress by seniority
 List of United States senators in the 86th Congress by seniority
 List of United States senators in the 87th Congress by seniority
 List of United States senators in the 88th Congress by seniority
 List of United States senators in the 89th Congress by seniority
 List of United States senators in the 90th Congress by seniority
 List of United States senators in the 91st Congress by seniority
 List of United States senators in the 92nd Congress by seniority
 List of United States senators in the 93rd Congress by seniority
 List of United States senators in the 94th Congress by seniority
 List of United States senators in the 95th Congress by seniority
 List of United States senators in the 96th Congress by seniority
 List of United States senators in the 97th Congress by seniority
 List of United States senators in the 98th Congress by seniority
 List of United States senators in the 99th Congress by seniority
 List of United States senators in the 100th Congress by seniority
 List of United States senators in the 101st Congress by seniority
 List of United States senators in the 102nd Congress by seniority
 List of United States senators in the 103rd Congress by seniority
 List of United States senators in the 104th Congress by seniority
 List of United States senators in the 105th Congress by seniority
 List of United States senators in the 106th Congress by seniority
 List of United States senators in the 107th Congress by seniority
 List of United States senators in the 108th Congress by seniority
 List of United States senators in the 109th Congress by seniority
 List of United States senators in the 110th Congress by seniority
 List of United States senators in the 111th Congress by seniority
 List of United States senators in the 112th Congress by seniority
 List of United States senators in the 113th Congress by seniority
 List of United States senators in the 114th Congress by seniority
 List of United States senators in the 115th Congress by seniority
 List of United States senators in the 116th Congress by seniority
 List of United States senators in the 117th Congress by seniority
 List of United States senators in the 118th Congress by seniority

Jurisdictions

Obsolete jurisdictions

Groups
 African Americans in the United States Congress
 List of Arab and Middle Eastern Americans in the United States Congress
 List of Asian Americans and Pacific Islands Americans in the United States Congress
 List of Hispanic Americans in the United States Congress
 List of Native Americans in the United States Congress
 List of Buddhist members of the United States Congress
 List of Hindu members of the United States Congress
 List of Jewish members of the United States Congress
 List of Mormon members of the United States Congress
 List of Muslim members of the United States Congress
 List of Quaker members of the United States Congress
 List of youngest members of the United States Congress
 List of LGBT members of the United States Congress

House of Representatives
 List of United States House committees
 Women in the United States House of Representatives
 List of African-American United States representatives

Senate
 List of United States Senate committees
 Women in the United States Senate
 List of African-American United States senators
 List of United States senators born outside the United States

Agencies, employees, and offices
 Architect of the Capitol
 Comptroller General of the United States
 Librarian of Congress
 Poet Laureate Consultant in Poetry to the Library of Congress

House of Representatives
 Chaplain of the United States House of Representatives
 Clerk of the United States House of Representatives
 Doorkeeper of the United States House of Representatives
 Historian of the United States House of Representatives
 Parliamentarian of the United States House of Representatives
 Postmaster of the United States House of Representatives
 Reading Clerk of the United States House of Representatives
 Sergeant at Arms of the United States House of Representatives

Senate
 Chaplain of the United States Senate
 United States Senate Librarian
 Secretary of the United States Senate
 Sergeant at Arms of the United States Senate

Politics and procedure
 List of United States federal legislation
 Caucuses of the United States Congress
 United States congressional committee
 Joint session of the United States Congress
 List of joint sessions of the United States Congress
 Party divisions of United States Congresses
 Third-party and independent members of the United States Congress
 List of congressional opponents of the Iraq War
 List of congressional opponents of the Vietnam War

House of Representatives
 List of United States House of Representatives committees

Senate
 List of United States Senate committees
 List of tie-breaking votes cast by vice presidents of the United States

Places
 List of United States congressional districts
 List of United States congressional districts by area
 List of obsolete United States congressional districts
 Congressional office buildings

Legislative branch of the United States government
Congress